Sedley is a census-designated place (CDP) in the middle of Southampton County, Virginia, United States. The population as of the 2010 Census was 470. It lies at an elevation of 89 feet (27 m).

References
Virginia Trend Report 2: State and Complete Places (Sub-state 2010 Census Data).

Census-designated places in Southampton County, Virginia
Unincorporated communities in Virginia
Census-designated places in Virginia